Clupeidae is a family of ray-finned fishes, comprising, for instance, the herrings, shads, sardines, hilsa, and menhadens. The clupeoids include many of the most important food fishes in the world, and are also commonly caught for production of fish oil and fish meal. Many members of the family have a body protected with shiny cycloid (very smooth and uniform) scales, a single dorsal fin, and a fusiform body for quick, evasive swimming and pursuit of prey composed of small planktonic animals. Due to their small size and position in the lower trophic level of many marine food webs, the levels of methylmercury they bioaccumulate are very low, reducing the risk of mercury poisoning when consumed.

Description and biology
Clupeids are mostly marine forage fish, although a few species are found in fresh water. No species has scales on the head, and some are entirely scaleless. The lateral line is short or absent, and the teeth are unusually small where they are present at all. Clupeids typically feed on plankton, and range from 2 to 75 cm (0.8 to 30 in.) in length.  The family  arguably also contains the "Sundasalangidae", a paedomorphic taxon first thought to be a distinct salmoniform family, but then discovered to be deeply nested in the Clupeidae. In the fossil record, clupeids date back to the early Paleogene.

Clupeids spawn huge numbers of eggs (up to 200,000 in some species) near the surface of the water. After hatching, the larvae live among the plankton until they develop a swim bladder and transform into adults. These eggs and fry are not protected or tended to by parents. The adults typically live in large shoals, seeking protection from piscivorous predators such as birds, sharks and other predatory fish, toothed whales, marine mammals, and jellyfish. They also form bait balls.

Commercially important species of the Clupeidae include  the Atlantic menhaden (Brevoortia tyrannus), the Atlantic and Baltic herrings (Clupea harengus), the Pacific herring (C. pallasii), and the European pilchard or sardine (Sardina pilchardus).

The family currently comprises 54 genera and around 200 species.

Feeding Physiology 
The Clupeidae family primarily feed on small planktonic organisms. The teeth of members of this family are either reduced or absent, indicating that these organisms do not need to cut or tear their prey items. They do, however, possess long gill rakers that are designed for sifting plankton and nutrients out of the water as it passes through their gills. Gill rakers are protrusions on the back side of the gills that help aquatic organisms to trap food particles.

In many Clupeidae, their diet primarily consists of phytoplankton and plant matter during their juvenile larval stages. As the fish mature this diet begins to shift towards larger and more substantive organisms, including more zooplankton and copepods. Small organisms like these do not need to be ground or torn apart for consumption so pronounced teeth would not serve a purpose in the feeding habits of Clupeidae, instead the use of filter feeding allows for much more efficient nutrient collection.

The fusiform body shape of Clupeidae is also advantageous to their trophic ecology. The tapering body form is a highly aerodynamic form that allows for quick increases in speed and a high maximum speed. Moving at high speeds allows the members of this family to regulate their feeding habits and avoid predators. Clupeidae can moderate the speed at which they swim to increase their uptake of nutrients. As with all filter feeders, Clupeidae cannot take in food if nutrient rich water does not pass over their gills. To moderate this, members of this family have been found to increase their swimming speed when they sense that there is a high concentration of food items in order to take advantage of this feeding period. Keeping a high swimming speed during periods of low food availability would not be efficient to maintain over long periods of time as the organisms would not net as much energy as they may need to in order to sustain themselves and increase their fitness. Increasing their swimming speed during feeding periods would allow them to take in more plankton while not suffering consequences from maintaining that speed.

Taxonomy
Taxonomy based on the works of Van der Laan 2017 and Nelson, Grande & Wilson 2016.
 †Knightia

 ?Subfamily Spratelloidinae Jordan 1925 sensu Lavoue et al. 2014
 Jenkinsia
 Spratelloides
 Subfamily Clupeinae Cuvier 1816 sensu Lavoue et al. 2013
 Clupea
 Ethmidium
 Hyperlophus
 Potamalosa
 Ramnogaster
 Sprattus
 Subfamily Ehiravinae (Deraniyagala 1929)
 Clupeichthys
 Clupeoides
 Clupeonella
 Corica
 Dayella
 Ehirava
 Gilchristella
 Minyclupeoides
 Sauvagella
 Spratellomorpha
 Sundasalanx
 Subfamily Alosinae Svetovidov 1952
 Alosa
 Brevoortia
 Sardina
 Sardinops
 Subfamily Dorosomatinae Gill 1861
 Harengula
 Lile
 Platanichthys
 Rhinosardinia
 Tribe Congothrissini
 Congothrissa
 Tribe Pellonulini
 Laeviscutella
 Limnothrissa
 Microthrissa [Poecilothrissa]
 Nannothrissa
 Odaxothrissa [Cynothrissa]
 Pellonula
 Potamothrissa
 Sierrathrissa
 Stolothrissa
 Thrattidion
 Tribe Anodontostomatini
 Anodontostoma
 Clupanodon
 Gonialosa
 Gudusia
 Konosirus
 Nematalosa
 Tenualosa
 Tribe Dorosomatini
 Amblygaster
 Dorosoma
 Escualosa
 Ethmalosa
 Herklotsichthys
 Hilsa
 Opisthonema
 Sardinella

References 

 
Extant Eocene first appearances
Ray-finned fish families
Taxa named by Georges Cuvier